Saint-Thomas-Didyme is a municipality in Maria-Chapdelaine Regional County Municipality in the Saguenay–Lac-Saint-Jean region of Quebec, Canada. It had a population of 703 in the Canada 2021 Census.

Demographics
Population trend:
 Population in 2021: 703 (2016 to 2021 population change: 4%)
 Population in 2016: 676 
 Population in 2011: 677 
 Population in 2006: 708
 Population in 2001: 797
 Population in 1996: 855
 Population in 1991: 944

Private dwellings occupied by usual residents: 364 (total dwellings: 518)

Mother tongue:
 English as first language: 0%
 French as first language: 96.5%
 English and French as first language: 0%
 Other as first language: 3.5%

References

Municipalities in Quebec
Incorporated places in Saguenay–Lac-Saint-Jean
Maria-Chapdelaine Regional County Municipality